The 1973–74 Pittsburgh Penguins season was the franchise's seventh season in the National Hockey League. The 'Century Line' of Syl Apps Jr., Lowell MacDonald and Jean Pronovost was established this season. The trio took their name as a result of combining for more than 100 goals over the course of the year.

Offseason

Regular season

Final standings

Schedule and results

|- style="background:#cfc;"
| 1 || Oct 12 || Pittsburgh Penguins || 4–3 || Atlanta Flames || Omni Coliseum || 1–0–0 || 2
|- style="background:#fcf;"
| 2 || Oct 13 || New York Rangers || 8–2 || Pittsburgh Penguins || Civic Arena || 1–1–0 || 2
|- style="background:#cfc;"
| 3 || Oct 17 || Pittsburgh Penguins || 4–2 || Minnesota North Stars || Met Center || 2–1–0 || 4
|- style="background:#cfc;"
| 4 || Oct 20 || California Golden Seals || 3–5 || Pittsburgh Penguins || Civic Arena || 3–1–0 || 6
|- style="background:#fcf;"
| 5 || Oct 21 || Pittsburgh Penguins || 2–8 || Boston Bruins || Boston Garden || 3–2–0 || 6
|- style="background:#fcf;"
| 6 || Oct 24 || Montreal Canadiens || 3–2 || Pittsburgh Penguins || Civic Arena || 3–3–0 || 6
|- style="background:#fcf;"
| 7 || Oct 27 || Philadelphia Flyers || 6–0 || Pittsburgh Penguins || Civic Arena || 3–4–0 || 6
|- style="background:#cfc;"
| 8 || Oct 28 || Pittsburgh Penguins || 7–2 || New York Rangers || Madison Square Garden (IV) || 4–4–0 || 8
|- style="background:#ffc;"
| 9 || Oct 31 || Pittsburgh Penguins || 1–1 || Montreal Canadiens || Montreal Forum || 4–4–1 || 9
|-

|- style="background:#fcf;"
| 10 || Nov 3 || Pittsburgh Penguins || 0–6 || Toronto Maple Leafs || Maple Leaf Gardens || 4–5–1 || 9
|- style="background:#fcf;"
| 11 || Nov 4 || Pittsburgh Penguins || 0–7 || Philadelphia Flyers || The Spectrum || 4–6–1 || 9
|- style="background:#ffc;"
| 12 || Nov 7 || New York Islanders || 1–1 || Pittsburgh Penguins || Civic Arena || 4–6–2 || 10
|- style="background:#ffc;"
| 13 || Nov 10 || Atlanta Flames || 4–4 || Pittsburgh Penguins || Civic Arena || 4–6–3 || 11
|- style="background:#cfc;"
| 14 || Nov 13 || Minnesota North Stars || 2–5 || Pittsburgh Penguins || Civic Arena || 5–6–3 || 13
|- style="background:#fcf;"
| 15 || Nov 15 || Pittsburgh Penguins || 3–5 || St. Louis Blues || St. Louis Arena || 5–7–3 || 13
|- style="background:#fcf;"
| 16 || Nov 17 || Chicago Black Hawks || 4–1 || Pittsburgh Penguins || Civic Arena || 5–8–3 || 13
|- style="background:#fcf;"
| 17 || Nov 18 || Pittsburgh Penguins || 0–7 || New York Rangers || Madison Square Garden (IV) || 5–9–3 || 13
|- style="background:#cfc;"
| 18 || Nov 21 || Vancouver Canucks || 4–5 || Pittsburgh Penguins || Civic Arena || 6–9–3 || 15
|- style="background:#cfc;"
| 19 || Nov 22 || Pittsburgh Penguins || 4–2 || Toronto Maple Leafs || Maple Leaf Gardens || 7–9–3 || 17
|- style="background:#fcf;"
| 20 || Nov 24 || Montreal Canadiens || 5–2 || Pittsburgh Penguins || Civic Arena || 7–10–3 || 17
|- style="background:#fcf;"
| 21 || Nov 28 || Toronto Maple Leafs || 4–3 || Pittsburgh Penguins || Civic Arena || 7–11–3 || 17
|-

|- style="background:#ffc;"
| 22 || Dec 1 || Atlanta Flames || 2–2 || Pittsburgh Penguins || Civic Arena || 7–11–4 || 18
|- style="background:#fcf;"
| 23 || Dec 2 || Pittsburgh Penguins || 1–2 || Chicago Black Hawks || Chicago Stadium || 7–12–4 || 18
|- style="background:#fcf;"
| 24 || Dec 5 || Pittsburgh Penguins || 1–4 || Los Angeles Kings || The Forum || 7–13–4 || 18
|- style="background:#fcf;"
| 25 || Dec 7 || Pittsburgh Penguins || 3–4 || California Golden Seals || Oakland Coliseum Arena || 7–14–4 || 18
|- style="background:#fcf;"
| 26 || Dec 8 || Pittsburgh Penguins || 2–3 || Vancouver Canucks || Pacific Coliseum || 7–15–4 || 18
|- style="background:#cfc;"
| 27 || Dec 12 || California Golden Seals || 1–9 || Pittsburgh Penguins || Civic Arena || 8–15–4 || 20
|- style="background:#fcf;"
| 28 || Dec 15 || Detroit Red Wings || 2–0 || Pittsburgh Penguins || Civic Arena || 8–16–4 || 20
|- style="background:#cfc;"
| 29 || Dec 16 || Pittsburgh Penguins || 2–1 || Atlanta Flames || Omni Coliseum || 9–16–4 || 22
|- style="background:#fcf;"
| 30 || Dec 20 || Pittsburgh Penguins || 5–6 || Boston Bruins || Boston Garden || 9–17–4 || 22
|- style="background:#fcf;"
| 31 || Dec 22 || New York Rangers || 4–1 || Pittsburgh Penguins || Civic Arena || 9–18–4 || 22
|- style="background:#fcf;"
| 32 || Dec 23 || Pittsburgh Penguins || 2–3 || Buffalo Sabres || Buffalo Memorial Auditorium || 9–19–4 || 22
|- style="background:#ffc;"
| 33 || Dec 26 || Pittsburgh Penguins || 2–2 || Detroit Red Wings || Olympia Stadium || 9–19–5 || 23
|- style="background:#fcf;"
| 34 || Dec 28 || St. Louis Blues || 3–1 || Pittsburgh Penguins || Civic Arena || 9–20–5 || 23
|- style="background:#fcf;"
| 35 || Dec 29 || Chicago Black Hawks || 4–2 || Pittsburgh Penguins || Civic Arena || 9–21–5 || 23
|-

|- style="background:#fcf;"
| 36 || Jan 2 || Pittsburgh Penguins || 4–8 || Minnesota North Stars || Met Center || 9–22–5 || 23
|- style="background:#fcf;"
| 37 || Jan 3 || Pittsburgh Penguins || 1–6 || Buffalo Sabres || Buffalo Memorial Auditorium || 9–23–5 || 23
|- style="background:#cfc;"
| 38 || Jan 5 || Buffalo Sabres || 2–5 || Pittsburgh Penguins || Civic Arena || 10–23–5 || 25
|- style="background:#fcf;"
| 39 || Jan 9 || Toronto Maple Leafs || 6–4 || Pittsburgh Penguins || Civic Arena || 10–24–5 || 25
|- style="background:#cfc;"
| 40 || Jan 12 || Buffalo Sabres || 2–5 || Pittsburgh Penguins || Civic Arena || 11–24–5 || 27
|- style="background:#fcf;"
| 41 || Jan 13 || Boston Bruins || 5–3 || Pittsburgh Penguins || Civic Arena || 11–25–5 || 27
|- style="background:#fcf;"
| 42 || Jan 16 || Los Angeles Kings || 2–0 || Pittsburgh Penguins || Civic Arena || 11–26–5 || 27
|- style="background:#cfc;"
| 43 || Jan 18 || Pittsburgh Penguins || 6–2 || Vancouver Canucks || Pacific Coliseum || 12–26–5 || 29
|- style="background:#cfc;"
| 44 || Jan 20 || Pittsburgh Penguins || 5–3 || Philadelphia Flyers || The Spectrum || 13–26–5 || 31
|- style="background:#cfc;"
| 45 || Jan 23 || St. Louis Blues || 1–4 || Pittsburgh Penguins || Civic Arena || 14–26–5 || 33
|- style="background:#fcf;"
| 46 || Jan 26 || Los Angeles Kings || 2–0 || Pittsburgh Penguins || Civic Arena || 14–27–5 || 33
|- style="background:#fcf;"
| 47 || Jan 27 || Pittsburgh Penguins || 5–6 || Detroit Red Wings || Olympia Stadium || 14–28–5 || 33
|- style="background:#fcf;"
| 48 || Jan 30 || New York Rangers || 4–2 || Pittsburgh Penguins || Civic Arena || 14–29–5 || 33
|-

|- style="background:#fcf;"
| 49 || Feb 2 || Chicago Black Hawks || 3–1 || Pittsburgh Penguins || Civic Arena || 14–30–5 || 33
|- style="background:#fcf;"
| 50 || Feb 3 || Pittsburgh Penguins || 4–5 || Boston Bruins || Boston Garden || 14–31–5 || 33
|- style="background:#fcf;"
| 51 || Feb 7 || Pittsburgh Penguins || 4–5 || Philadelphia Flyers || The Spectrum || 14–32–5 || 33
|- style="background:#cfc;"
| 52 || Feb 9 || Pittsburgh Penguins || 3–2 || New York Islanders || Nassau Veterans Memorial Coliseum || 15–32–5 || 35
|- style="background:#fcf;"
| 53 || Feb 10 || Pittsburgh Penguins || 3–5 || Chicago Black Hawks || Chicago Stadium || 15–33–5 || 35
|- style="background:#cfc;"
| 54 || Feb 13 || Detroit Red Wings || 3–5 || Pittsburgh Penguins || Civic Arena || 16–33–5 || 37
|- style="background:#cfc;"
| 55 || Feb 16 || California Golden Seals || 3–7 || Pittsburgh Penguins || Civic Arena || 17–33–5 || 39
|- style="background:#ffc;"
| 56 || Feb 20 || St. Louis Blues || 1–1 || Pittsburgh Penguins || Civic Arena || 17–33–6 || 40
|- style="background:#fcf;"
| 57 || Feb 23 || Boston Bruins || 6–2 || Pittsburgh Penguins || Civic Arena || 17–34–6 || 40
|- style="background:#cfc;"
| 58 || Feb 24 || Pittsburgh Penguins || 4–2 || Chicago Black Hawks || Chicago Stadium || 18–34–6 || 42
|- style="background:#cfc;"
| 59 || Feb 27 || Los Angeles Kings || 1–4 || Pittsburgh Penguins || Civic Arena || 19–34–6 || 44
|- style="background:#fcf;"
| 60 || Feb 28 || Pittsburgh Penguins || 1–7 || Montreal Canadiens || Montreal Forum || 19–35–6 || 44
|-

|- style="background:#cfc;"
| 61 || Mar 2 || Vancouver Canucks || 1–6 || Pittsburgh Penguins || Civic Arena || 20–35–6 || 46
|- style="background:#cfc;"
| 62 || Mar 5 || Pittsburgh Penguins || 2–1 || New York Islanders || Nassau Veterans Memorial Coliseum || 21–35–6 || 48
|- style="background:#ffc;"
| 63 || Mar 7 || Pittsburgh Penguins || 2–2 || Toronto Maple Leafs || Maple Leaf Gardens || 21–35–7 || 49
|- style="background:#cfc;"
| 64 || Mar 9 || Pittsburgh Penguins || 7–5 || St. Louis Blues || St. Louis Arena || 22–35–7 || 51
|- style="background:#fcf;"
| 65 || Mar 10 || Montreal Canadiens || 5–4 || Pittsburgh Penguins || Civic Arena || 22–36–7 || 51
|- style="background:#fcf;"
| 66 || Mar 13 || Pittsburgh Penguins || 1–5 || Los Angeles Kings || The Forum || 22–37–7 || 51
|- style="background:#cfc;"
| 67 || Mar 15 || Pittsburgh Penguins || 6–1 || California Golden Seals || Oakland Coliseum Arena || 23–37–7 || 53
|- style="background:#cfc;"
| 68 || Mar 16 || Pittsburgh Penguins || 8–6 || Vancouver Canucks || Pacific Coliseum || 24–37–7 || 55
|- style="background:#ffc;"
| 69 || Mar 20 || New York Islanders || 1–1 || Pittsburgh Penguins || Civic Arena || 24–37–8 || 56
|- style="background:#fcf;"
| 70 || Mar 23 || Pittsburgh Penguins || 1–5 || Minnesota North Stars || Met Center || 24–38–8 || 56
|- style="background:#cfc;"
| 71 || Mar 24 || Detroit Red Wings || 0–8 || Pittsburgh Penguins || Civic Arena || 25–38–8 || 58
|- style="background:#ffc;"
| 72 || Mar 27 || Minnesota North Stars || 3–3 || Pittsburgh Penguins || Civic Arena || 25–38–9 || 59
|- style="background:#fcf;"
| 73 || Mar 30 || Pittsburgh Penguins || 3–4 || St. Louis Blues || St. Louis Arena || 25–39–9 || 59
|- style="background:#cfc;"
| 74 || Mar 31 || Atlanta Flames || 2–4 || Pittsburgh Penguins || Civic Arena || 26–39–9 || 61
|-

|- style="background:#fcf;"
| 75 || Apr 2 || Pittsburgh Penguins || 2–3 || New York Islanders || Nassau Veterans Memorial Coliseum || 26–40–9 || 61
|- style="background:#cfc;"
| 76 || Apr 4 || Buffalo Sabres || 2–4 || Pittsburgh Penguins || Civic Arena || 27–40–9 || 63
|- style="background:#cfc;"
| 77 || Apr 6 || Philadelphia Flyers || 1–6 || Pittsburgh Penguins || Civic Arena || 28–40–9 || 65
|- style="background:#fcf;"
| 78 || Apr 7 || Pittsburgh Penguins || 3–6 || Atlanta Flames || Omni Coliseum || 28–41–9 || 65
|-

|- style="text-align:center;"
| Legend:       = Win       = Loss       = Tie

Playoffs
The Penguins failed to make the playoffs for the second consecutive year.

Player statistics
Skaters

Goaltenders

†Denotes player spent time with another team before joining the Penguins.  Stats reflect time with the Penguins only.
‡Denotes player was traded mid-season.  Stats reflect time with the Penguins only.

Transactions
The Penguins were involved in the following transactions during the 1973–74 season:

Trades

Additions and subtractions

Draft picks
Pittsburgh Penguins' picks at the 1973 NHL Amateur Draft. 

Draft notes
 The Detroit Red Wings' second-round pick went to the Pittsburgh Penguins as a result of an October 6, 1972, trade that sent Roy Edwards to the Red Wings in exchange for a 1974 second-round pick and this pick.
 The Pittsburgh Penguins' third-round pick went to the Detroit Red Wings as the result of a February 25, 1973, trade that sent Andy Brown to the Penguins in exchange for this pick.

References

Pittsburgh Penguins seasons
Pittsburgh
Pittsburgh
Pitts
Pitts